The 1996–97 season was the 95th season in which Dundee competed at a Scottish national level, playing in the Scottish First Division. Dundee would finish in 3rd place, 2 points away from the promotion play-offs. Dundee would also compete in the Scottish League Cup, the Scottish Cup and the Scottish Challenge Cup, where they were knocked out by Greenock Morton in the 4th round of the Scottish Cup, by St Johnstone in the quarter-finals of the Challenge Cup, and by Heart of Midlothian in the semi-finals of the League Cup.

Scottish First Division 

Statistics provided by Dee Archive.

League table

Scottish League Cup 

Statistics provided by Dee Archive.

Scottish Cup 

Statistics provided by Dee Archive.

Scottish Challenge Cup 

Statistics provided by Dee Archive.

Player statistics 
Statistics provided by Dee Archive

|}

See also 

 List of Dundee F.C. seasons

References

External links 

 1996–97 Dundee season on Fitbastats

Dundee F.C. seasons
Dundee